Gar Gaz (also Romanized as Gar Kaz) is a village in Jargalan Rural District, Raz and Jargalan District, Bojnord County, North Khorasan Province, Iran. At the 2006 census, its population was 2,014, in 460 families.

References 

Populated places in Bojnord County